Kala may refer to:

Given name
 Kala (choreographer) (born 1971), Indian choreographer
 Kala Alexander (born 1969), American surfer and actor
 Kala Ramnath (born 1967), Indian violinist
 Kala Savage (born 1978), American actress
 Kala Venkata Rao (1900–1959), Indian freedom fighter and politician
 Kala Nath Shastry (born 1936), Indian Sanskrit scholar

Surname
 Anirudh Kala, psychiatrist based in Ludhiana, India
 Brijendra Kala, Indian film actor
 Chandra Prakash Kala, Indian ecologist
 Hemlata Kala (born 1975), Indian cricketer
 Hüseyin Kala (born 1987), Turkish footballer
 Itzik Kala, Israeli singer
 Minna Mäki-Kala, Finnish beauty pageant titleholder
 Advaita Kala, Indian Writer

See also

Kaja (name)
Kali (name)
Kalla (name)